Yanjiao is a town under the administration of Sanhe City in central Hebei province, bordering Tongzhou District, Beijing across the Chaobai River to the west, located  east of Tiananmen Square and  west of Sanhe. It has a population of 250,000, with long-term residents accounting for 147,000 and migrants constituting the remainder; 97.9% of the population is of Han ethnicity. , it has 55 villages under its administration.

History
The area was once located in the suburbs of the seat of the State of Yan of the Spring and Autumn period and Warring States period, hence the town's name. Before the establishment of the People's Republic, the area was administered by Tong County (present-day Tongzhou District), then in 1950 was ceded to Sanhe County; from 1958 to 1961, as part of the greater collectivization of agriculture, it was a part of Hongxing People's Commune; 1962 saw Hongxing being split into three smaller communes, amongst them Yanjiao itself. Economic reforms led to the abolishing of the commune and the establishment of Yanjiao as a town in March 1983.

Geography
Yanjiao is located in the extreme western end of Sanhe City and in the northwest of the Sanhe–Xianghe–Dachang exclave of Hebei. In addition to bordering Tongzhou District, Beijing to the west, it borders the town of Gaolou to the north and Dachang Hui Autonomous County to the east and south.

Transport

See also
List of township-level divisions of Hebei

References

Township-level divisions of Hebei
Sanhe, Hebei